Armen Amiryan is an associate professor, a TV host, a director and a writer. On 21 September 2015, he was awarded the title of Honored Worker of Culture of Armenia. Worked as the Minister of Culture of Armenia until his resignation on 2 May 2018.

Career
Since 1982 he has hosted children's and youth programs on the State television of Armenia.

In 1984 started working as a director's assistant on the State Television and Radio State Committee of Armenia.

From 1986 to 1988 served in the Soviet Army.

From 1985 to 1997 worked in the broadcasting department. Hosted news, political programs, music and entertainment programs, official events of state and national holidays.

After graduation, worked as a lecturer for some time at the same institute.

From 1990 to 1995 authored "Khchankar" ("Mosaic"), "Kachmeruk" ("Crossroads"), "Bari luys" ("Good morning"), "Postarkgh" ("Postbox") and other programs.

In 1996 founded  "Ar Radio Intercontinental" company and "Armenakob" cultural center, which served to implement a number of charitable programs. He is a member of the Spiritual Council of the Ararat Patriarchal Diocese of the Armenian Apostolic Church. He is also a member of the International Academy of Television and Radio and was awarded the gold medal of the mentioned academy.

From 1997 to 2015 was the executive director of Public Radio of Armenia.

In 2000 founded "Armenakob" TV company.

In 2009 was elected a member of the Public Council of the Police of Armenia.

In 2010 was the acting executive director of the Public Television Company of Armenia.

From 2010 to 2013 headed the TV and Radio Journalism Chair of the Faculty of Culture of Yerevan State Pedagogical University named after Khachatur Abovyan.
On December 16, 2015 by the decree of the President of RA, he was appointed a member of the Council of the Public Television and Radio Company for a period of six years, on September 27, 2016, was dismissed from the position of a member of the Council of the Public Television and Radio Company.

On September 27, 2016 he was appointed the Minister of Culture of the Republic of Armenia by the decree (NH-1053-А) of the President of the Republic of Armenia. On May 2, 2018, being the acting Minister of Culture, he submitted his resignation.

He wrote and published two books: "General's Dream" (tragi-comedy) in 2020 and "Noye" (film scenario) in 2022 in both English and Armenian.

References

1969 births
Living people
Academic staff of Armenian State Pedagogical University
Television directors
Armenian television producers
Armenian male writers